Trichophaga is a genus of the fungus moth family, Tineidae. Therein, it belongs to the moninate subfamily Tineinae.

Species
Species of Trichophaga are:
 Trichophaga bipartitella (Ragonot 1892) (=Trichophaga amina Meyrick, 1925, Trichophaga desertella Mabille, 1907)
 Trichophaga cuspidata Gozmány, 1967
 Trichophaga mormopis Meyrick, 1935
 Trichophaga robinsoni Gaedike & Karsholt 2001 (=Tinea abruptella Wollaston, 1858)
 Trichophaga scandinaviella Zagulajev 1960 (=Trichophaga rjabovi Zagulajev, 1960)
 Trichophaga swinhoei (Butler, 1884) (=Trichophaga coprobiella Ragonot, 1894)
 Trichophaga tapetzella – tapestry moth, carpet moth
 Trichophaga ziniella Zagulajev, 1960

Footnotes

References

  (2013): Trichophaga. Version 2.6.2, 2013-AUG-29. Retrieved 2016-January-26.

Tineinae